Dadwal, also written as Dadhwal and Dhadwal, is a surname prevalent in Punjab, Himachal Pradesh and Jammu.

History
According to Brentnall (2004), Dadwals are Katoch Rajputs. Hutchison and Vogel (1933, 1994) state that the Dadwal clan takes its name from a place called Dada which was within Siba State. Dada is also called Dadasiba and is now in the Kangra district of Himachal Pradesh.  The royal family of Datarpur came into existence after Hari Chand seceded from the kingdom of Kangra and established his own kingdom in Guler (1415). His descendant, Sibarn Chand then seceded from Guler and established the kingdom of Siba and in turn one of his descendants, Khammi Chand, had three sons one of whom was Lakhuda Chand who lived at Dada and adopted the clan name Dadwal.

According to Ranken (1895), "the Dadwals are so called from Dada, a fort on the Beas, which was built by the founder of the clan when it seceded from Siba". Lakhuda Chand's grandson, Datar Chand established the Datarpur state in 1550 which is in now Hoshiarpur district. The present head of the royal family of Datarpur is Kunwar Deepak Singh who is a descendant of Raja Datarchand.

According to Rose (1919, 1990) however, the Dhadwals are also Jat who migrated from Hoshiarpur into Kapurthala district. Barstow (1928) reported that in the 1911 census of the Punjab, 515 people were returned as Dadwal Jat in Amritsar district. In modern times, the Oxford Dictionary of Family Names in Britain and Ireland (2016) also lists Dhadwal as a Jat clan.

Locations
The following is a list of places known as Dadwal:
Dadwal village - Janauri, Hoshiarpar Punjab 
Dhadwal village- Siprian, Hoshiarpur, Punjab, India
 Dadwal village - Bilaspur, Himachal Pradesh.
 Dadwal village - Pathankot, Punjab, India.
 Dhadwal town- Narowal, Punjab, Pakistan.
 Dhadwal village - Dharamshala, Himachal Pradesh, India.
 Dadhwal Village - Depur, Hoshiarpur, Punjab India
 Dadhwal Village - Fatehpur, Hoshiarpur, Punjab India
 Dadhwal Village - Bhanowal

References

Surnames